Uncharacterized protein chromosome 7 open reading frame 61 is an asparagine-poor protein in humans encoded by the c7orf61 gene. The protein function is relatively unknown and is highly conserved in mammals.

Gene

Locus
C7orf61 is located on the reverse (or negative) DNA strand and is situated in chromosome 7 (7q22.1) from base pairs 100,456,615-100,464,271 - roughly 7,656 bp. It has a total of 3 exons and lacks isoforms.

mRNA
The mRNA is approximately 1019 bp and belongs to domain of unknown function 4703 (PFAM15775).

Protein
In humans, the protein contains a total of 206 amino acids. The protein's molecular weight is 23.71 kDa and its isoelectric point is 10.41. DUF4703 is positioned 22-206aa of the protein. Neither the gene or its protein has another known alias, but can be found with high affinity in several primate species.

Composition
The amino acid composition of C7orf61 consists of high frequencies in leucine, serine, and charged valine. The protein has an unusual low frequency in asparagine, making it an asparagine-deficient protein, and contains higher frequencies of salt-bridge formations between glutamic acid, aspartic acid, lysine, and arginine.

Characteristics and structure
The consent within secondary structure prediction tools CFSSP, SSPRED, and GOR4  is that the protein's secondary structure consist mainly of α-helices (51.2%), with significant amounts of coiling (38.2%) and smaller fragments of beta strands (10.3%).

Post-translational modifications
C7orf61 has several post-translation modification sites, most of which involve serine/threonine kinases - protein kinase C, Casein kinase II, DNA-dependent protein kinase, and Cyclin-dependent kinase 1. It is predicted to contain a Biparte nuclear localization signal (NLS_BP), a leucine-rich variant domain (LRV), and bacterial Ig-like domain (BIG-1).

Subcellular localization
C7orf61 does not contain any trans-membrane domains or signal peptides. The protein is predicted to be localized in the Mitochondria, with little indication of extracellular activity. Expanded analysis of amino acid sequence KFFRWVRRAWQRIISWVF near the N-terminal suggests the presence of a mitochondrial targeting signal.

Gene regulation
C7orf61 has high levels of expression in the testis and lower levels in the brain and connective tissues. Through the assessment of microarray experiments available on NCBI Geo, its inferred that c7orf61 is under negative regulation.

Homology
C7orf61 does not have any paralogs. Analysis via NCBI tool BLASTt found the gene to be highly conserved in mammals and could not be traced farther back than 160 MYA. The following table contains a list of orthologs found in several mammalian sub-classes - this is not a comprehensive list for the proteins orthology.

References